Pakundia is an upazila (subdistrict) in Kishoreganj District, Dhaka Division, Bangladesh. It has a population of 237,218 residents. It was formed in 1922 as a thana. On the 14th of September 1983, it was turned into an upazila.

Geography

It has 39,924 households and total area . It is bounded by the Old Brahmaputra and Gafargaon to its west, Kapasia to its southwest, Manohardi to its south, Katiadi to the southeast, Kishoreganj Sadar to the north, and Hossainpur to its northwest. The Old Brahmaputra is the main river of Pakundia. Inside the upazila, another river named Singua flows from Bill Moisber through Kaliachapara and joins Ghorautra river with Nikli in the Bhati area of the district. Other important bodies of water in Pakundia include the Narsunda River, Banar, Mangalahat as well as the beels of Padmakuri, Bhara, Kahetardia, Chaityakabali, Baranala, Bejurnala, Naothaghya and Digha.

History

Pakundia is home to the ancient town of Egarosindur, dating back to 1000 BC. Xuanzang mentions that the land as having been newly raised, and surrounded by dense forest. By the 8th century, the people of this area began trading with Ancient Rome and Persia.  As the forest-dwelling hill people settled here in the 9th to 10th century, tribes such as the Koch, Garo, Hajong, Ahom and Mech emerged as small groups under the feudal kingdoms. Due to various reasons, there was internal conflict between these feudal kings.  After coming into the hands of Sultan Fakhruddin Mubarak Shah in the 1330s, the fort-town became incorporated within the Sultanate of Bengal. In the medieval period, a Sufi wali known as Malang Shah arrived with the intention of propagating Islam to the masses. Some sources state that he was among eleven preachers, after whom Egarosindur is named after. Described as a pure soul (pakwan deha), Malang Shah was buried in his khanqah during his death and the area came to be known as Pakundia (a corruption of pakwandeha). Sukumar Sen theorises that the name actually comes from the Pakur tree, which is found abundantly in the area, and the term diya (a highland surrounded by water on both sides).

During the reign of the Mughal emperor Shah Jahan, Shaykh Sadi bin Shiru established the Sadi Mosque in 1651. Emperor Aurangzeb granted a jagir of 62 mouzas to Shaykh Muhammad Hanif al-Muhaddith, instructing him to migrate from Delhi to eastern Bengal. Hanif established the Mian Bari zamindari in present-day Pakundia.

In 1802, the Mangalbaria Madrasa was founded. In 1919, the Tarakandi Madrasa was established. Three years later, the British colonial authorities founded a police headquarters (thana) in Pakundia. During the Bangladesh Liberation War of 1971, the Bengali freedom fighters battled the Pakistan Army in areas such as Kaliachapra, Kodalia and Tarakandi. 200 residents of Pakundia were killed by the army, and buried in a mass grave next to the BADC headquarters. Among the leading freedom fighters of Pakundia is Badiul Alam who was subsequently awarded with Bir Bikrom. The status of Pakundia Thana was upgraded to upazila (sub-district) on 14 September 1983 as part of the President of Bangladesh Hussain Muhammad Ershad's decentralisation programme.

Demographics
As of the 1991 Bangladesh census, Pakundia has a population of 210,355. Males are 51.26% of the population, and females 48.74%. This Upazila's eighteen up population is 103,661. Pakundia has an average literacy rate of 40.8% (7+ years), and the national average of 42.4% literate.

Administration

Pakundia Upazila is divided into Pakundia Municipality, and nine union parishads: Barudia, Chandipasha, Char Faradi, Egarasindur, Hosendi, Jangalia, Narandi, Patuabhanga, and Sukhia. The union parishads are subdivided into 97 mauzas and 150 villages.

Pakundia Municipality is subdivided into 9 wards and 25 mahallas.

Education 

There are many educational facilities in Pakundia including:
Mangalbaria Kamil Madrasa
Nur Husayni Alim Madrasa
Panchlagota Senior Alim Madrasa
Shailjani Alim Madrasa
Azharul Uloom Dakhil Madrasa
Chardiga Islamic Dakhil Madrasa
Mirdi Fazil Madrasa
Tarakandi Fazil Madrasa
Saloadi Dakhil Madrasa
Patuabhanga Dakhil Madrasa
Kaghachar Womens Madrasa
Husayndi Model Dakhil Madrasa
Porabaria Dakhil Madrasa
Chilahara Dakhil Madrasa
Pakundia Adarsha Mohila College
Pakundia Government College

Notable people 
 ABM Zahidul Haq, politician, former Deputy Minister of Shipping and founder of Pakundia Adarsha Mohila College
 Abul Kashem Fazlul Haq, columnist and activist
 Farid Uddin Masood, Islamic scholar
 Jibon Rahman, film director
 Matiur Rahman, military pilot

See also 
 List of upazilas in Bangladesh

References

External links 
 

Pakundia Upazila